Dan Gediman is an American radio producer and performing songwriter. He is the executive producer of the public radio series This I Believe and co-editor, with Jay Allison, of the books This I Believe and This I Believe II: The Personal Philosophies of Remarkable Men and Women. He is also the co-editor, with John Gregory and Mary Jo Gediman, of the books This I Believe: On Love, This I Believe: On Fatherhood, This I Believe: On Motherhood, and This I Believe: Life Lessons, as well as Edward R. Murrow's This I Believe, This I Believe: Kentucky, and This I Believe: Philadelphia. He has also edited a new edition of Will Thomas's memoir The Seeking.

Gediman's public radio work has been featured on programs such as This American Life,  All Things Considered, Morning Edition, and Jazz Profiles. His public radio specials include Little Secrets: Child Sexual Abuse in America, and Breaking the Cycle: How Do We Stop Child Abuse  with Jay Allison. Gediman co-produced the DuPont-Columbia Award-winning 50 Years After 14 August, a reflection on the end of World War II, with legendary radio playwright Norman Corwin and Mary Beth Kirchner. In 2017, he produced for Audible Originals the documentary series The Home Front: Life in America During World War Two, narrated by Martin Sheen.

References

External links 
Dan Gediman's website
This I Believe, Inc.
This I Believe (book) reading guides

American radio producers
NPR personalities
Living people
Year of birth missing (living people)